Sheppards Mill is an unincorporated community and census-designated place (CDP) in Cumberland County, in the U.S. state of New Jersey. It is located in the western part of the county in northeastern Greenwich Township and southwestern Hopewell Township. The community is centered on Mill Creek, which is dammed to form Sheppards Millpond in the northwestern part of the CDP. Mill Creek is a southwest-flowing tributary of Wheaton Run, part of the Cohansey River watershed leading to Delaware Bay.

Sheppards Mill was first listed as a CDP prior to the 2020 census.

References 

Census-designated places in Cumberland County, New Jersey
Census-designated places in New Jersey
Greenwich Township, Cumberland County, New Jersey
Hopewell Township, Cumberland County, New Jersey